Roland Fischnaller may refer to:

 Roland Fischnaller (snowboarder) (born 1980), Italian snowboarder
 Roland Fischnaller (alpine skier) (born 1975), Italian former alpine skier